La Rue is a small unincorporated community in the town of Freedom, in Sauk County, Wisconsin, United States. It is located on a spur line of the former Chicago and North Western Railway.  Heritage railway excursions from the Mid-Continent Railway Museum, in North Freedom, Wisconsin, go through La Rue.

The community was named for W. G. La Rue, who held local mining interests.

Notes

Unincorporated communities in Wisconsin
Unincorporated communities in Sauk County, Wisconsin